Nelligan may refer to:

 Nelligan (electoral district), a provincial electoral district in Quebec, Canada
 Nelligan (film), a Canadian drama film
Nelligen, New South Wales, a village in New South Wales, Australia

People with the surname
 David Neligan (1899–1983)
 Émile Nelligan (1879–1941), Quebec poet
 James Nelligan (born 1929), former US politician member of the United States House of Representatives
 Kate Nelligan (born 1950), Canadian actress